Australian actor Ben Mendelsohn first rose to prominence in Australia with his breakout role in the 1987 coming of age drama film The Year My Voice Broke. He has gone on to co-star in the films Animal Kingdom (2010), The Dark Knight Rises (2012), and Starred Up (2013). He co-starred in the 2014 films Lost River with Christina Hendricks, Exodus: Gods and Kings with Christian Bale and Black Sea with Jude Law. In 2015, he starred in the American drama film Mississippi Grind with Ryan Reynolds. The following year, he was cast as Orson Krennic in the epic space opera film Rogue One, the first installment of the Star Wars anthology series. He portrayed King George VI in the 2017 war drama film Darkest Hour with Gary Oldman. The same year, it was announced that he would be joining the Marvel Cinematic Universe as Talos. He has played the character in Captain Marvel (2019), Spider-Man: Far From Home (2019) and will reprise the role in the upcoming 2022 Disney+ series Secret Invasion.

In 2018, he played the antagonist Nolan Sorrento in Steven Spielberg's dystopian science fiction adventure film Ready Player One, based on Ernest Cline's novel of the same name. He also co-starred in the drama film Untogether, written and directed by his then-wife Emma Forrest and action-adventure film Robin Hood as the Sheriff of Nottingham. The same year, he starred in the drama film The Land of Steady Habits with Connie Britton.

Mendelsohn's Australian television work includes playing Warren Murphy on the soap opera Neighbours (1986–1987), a recurring role on the drama series Love My Way (2006–2007), and a main role in the drama series Tangle (2009). In 2015, he was cast as Danny Rayburn in the American Netflix original thriller drama television series Bloodline (2015–2017). The role earned him the Primetime Emmy Award for Outstanding Supporting Actor in a Drama Series in 2016. From 2019 to 2020, he voiced the character of Special Agent Mace in the animated series Infinity Train. Then in 2020, he starred in the HBO psychological thriller-horror crime drama series based on the 2018 novel of the same name by Stephen King, The Outsider.

Film

Television

Theatre

References

External links
 

Male actor filmographies
Australian filmographies